Sir Lewis Duthie Ritchie  (born 26 June 1952) is a Scottish medical doctor who worked as a general practitioner (GP) and medical researcher. He is the James Mackenzie Professor of General Practice at the University of Aberdeen and holds honorary professorships at the University of Edinburgh and the University of the Highlands and Islands.

Early life and education
Ritchie was born in Fraserburgh to Sheila Gladys and Lewis Duthie Ritchie. He attended Fraserburgh Academy before going on to study chemistry and medicine at the University of Aberdeen, graduating with BSc and MB ChB (with commendation) in 1978. He received his MD from the University in 1993. In 1982, he graduated from the University of Edinburgh with an MSc in community medicine.

Career
Ritchie was appointed the James Mackenzie Professor of General Practice at the University of Aberdeen in 1992. In 2012 he was appointed director of Public Health in NHS Grampian.

In January 2015, the Scottish Government announced him as the chair of a review into out-of-hours services. Ritchie said that to inform the review he had talked to doctors, patients, ambulance staff and NHS 24 workers. Ten months later, his report made 28 recommendations.

Ritchie retired from practicing medicine in 2012. To mark the occasion he bought the Julia Park Barry, a lifeboat that had been used to save hundreds of people before being taken out of service in 1969. He gifted it to the community.

In 2014 he was appointed chair of Council of the Queen's Nursing Institute Scotland (QNIS).

In 2017 he was named as chair of a group of independent advisers, charged with looking at NHS Tayside's financial difficulties and to report to Scottish Government within a three month period.

In January 2018 he was named as the chair of a review of urgent care services in Skye, Lochalsh and Wester Ross. Interim findings were published a few months later.

Awards and honours
He was made OBE in the 2011 Queen's Birthday Honours. He was elected as a fellow of the Royal Society of Edinburgh in 2016.

In the 2011 New Year Honours he was made Knight Bachelor for services to the NHS in Scotland. He was invested on 5 July 2011.

References

External links
 profile at University of Aberdeen

1952 births
Living people
People from Fraserburgh
People educated at Fraserburgh Academy
20th-century Scottish medical doctors
21st-century Scottish medical doctors
Scottish general practitioners
Fellows of the Royal College of General Practitioners
Fellows of the Royal Society of Edinburgh
Officers of the Order of the British Empire
Knights Bachelor